Drač is a neighbourhood of Podgorica, Montenegro.

Drač is bounded by Belgrade–Bar railway, Oktobarske Revolucije street, Pete Proleterske Boulevard and Bratstva - Jedinstva street.

See also
List of Podgorica neighbourhoods and suburbs#Drač and Stara Varoš

References

Suburbs of Podgorica